Panja Sharif (or Punja Shareef) the oldest Karbala in the city of Delhi. It is located at Kashmiri Gate. It is a major majlis khana (meeting place) used for Karbala mourning ceremonies.

Maulana Kalbe Rushaid Rizvi has addressed the ashrae majalis (series of 10 majalis) of Panja Sharif Imambargah for many years.

Mirza Muhammad Kamil Dehlavi is buried there.

See also
 List of Shia mosques in NCR

References

External links
Azadari in Delhi 10th Muhramme 1431 : Videos, A Shia Event that Delhi will never forget, Wednesday, 30 December 2009

Religious buildings and structures in Delhi
Islam in India
Islam in Delhi
Shia mosques in India